Domenico Doardo (born 3 July 1974) is an Italian former professional footballer and current goalkeeper coach of Premier League side Sunderland A.F.C. Doardo made over 150 league appearances during his career and represented Italy at youth level.

Career

Doardo played professionally for several teams in his native Italy, including Torino and Hellas Verona, with whom he played in Serie A before dropping down the leagues during his later career.

During the mid-1990s and whilst under the management Cesare Maldini, Doardo represented Italy Under-21s on seven occasions.

Coaching career

In May 2011 Doardo linked-up with fellow Italian, Paolo Di Canio, to act as goalkeeper coach for Swindon Town. First team goalkeeper Wes Foderingham has since paid tribute to Doardo after making significant progress since joining the club from Crystal Palace.

Doardo then followed Paolo di Canio to sunderland and became head goalkeeping coach

References

External links
Profile at the official Swindon Town website

Living people
Italian footballers
1974 births
Sunderland A.F.C. non-playing staff
Association football goalkeepers
Novara F.C. players
Hellas Verona F.C. players
Treviso F.B.C. 1993 players
L.R. Vicenza players
Genoa C.F.C. players
U.S. Cremonese players
Torino F.C. players
Ravenna F.C. players